The 1996 Trofeo Conde de Godó was a men's tennis tournament played on outdoor clay courts at the Real Club de Tenis Barcelona in Barcelona in Spain and was part of the Championship Series of the 1996 ATP Tour. The tournament was held from 15 April through 21 April 1996. Thomas Muster won the singles title.

Finals

Singles

 Thomas Muster defeated  Marcelo Ríos 6–3, 4–6, 6–4, 6–1 
 It was Muster's 3rd title of the year and the 39th of his career.

Doubles

 Luis Lobo /  Javier Sánchez defeated  Neil Broad /  Piet Norval 6–1, 6–3
 It was Lobo's 1st title of the year and the 4th of his career. It was Sánchez's 1st title of the year and the 23rd of his career.

References

External links
 Official website
 ATP tournament profile
 ITF tournament edition details

 
Godo
Barcelona Open (tennis)
Godo